Gram-negative toe web infection is a skin condition that often begins with dermatophytosis.

Gram-negative toe web infection is a relatively common infection. It is commonly found on people who are engaged in athletic activities while wearing closed-toe or tight fitting shoes. It grows in a moist environment.  Gram-negative is mixed bacterial infection with the following organisms:
 Moraxella
 Alcaligenes
 Acinetobacter
 Pseudomonas
 Proteus
 Erwinia
This mixing of infection and organisms may also cause a mild secondary infection of athlete's foot.

See also 
 Skin lesion

References

External links 

 

Bacterium-related cutaneous conditions